Alan Whitmore Cornwall (4 October 1858 – 9 June 1932) was Archdeacon of Cheltenham from 1924 until his death.
 
Born at Uley on 4 October 1858  into an ecclesiastical family  he was educated at Eton and University College, Oxford and ordained after a period of study at Wells Theological College in 1884. After curacies in Cirencester and Gloucester he was the Vicar of Coleford from 1891 until 1899; and then of Thornbury until his Archdeacon's appointment.

He died on 9 June 1932. His son, Nigel, was Bishop of Borneo from 1949 until  1962.

References

1858 births
People from Uley
People educated at Eton College
Alumni of University College, Oxford
Archdeacons of Cheltenham
1932 deaths